The 2015 Peru Cup season, the largest amateur tournament of Peruvian football, started in February.

This edition has featured a change, with the elimination of the Regional Stage and the inclusion of participants from all the Regions of Peru in the National Stage. Under the new format, the tournament has four stages. The first three stages are played as mini-league round-robin tournaments, and the fourth stage is played under POT System intellectual property of the MatchVision company.

The 2015 Peru Cup started with the District Stage in February.  The next stage was the Provincial Stage which started in June. The tournament continued with the Departmental Stage in July. The National Stage starts in September. The winner of the National Stage will be promoted to the First Division and the runner-up will be promoted to the Second Division.

Departmental stage
Departmental Stage: 2015 Ligas Departamentales del Peru and 2015 Ligas Superiores del Peru

The following list shows the teams that qualified for the National Stage.

National stage
For the first time, all the Regions of Peru will have representation in the National Stage, which will be played under Regional using the POT System. The new National Stage starts in the second week of September.

This new phase features the 50 teams that qualified from the Departmental Stage. Each team plays 3 games at home and 3 games away, for a total of 6 games against 3 different geographical rivals. The departmental stage winners only play against departmental runners-up, and vice versa. All the teams are positioned in one general table. After 6 matches, the team in places 1 to 8 are qualified directly to the Round of 16, while the teams in places 9 to 24 will play the Repechage phase. The teams in places 25 to 50 are eliminated.

The creator of this format is the Chilean Leandro A. Shara

The winner of the National Stage will be promoted to the 2016 Torneo Descentralizado and the runner-up of the National Stage will be promoted to the 2016 Peruvian Segunda División.

Tie-breaking criteria 
The ranking of teams in the Unique Table is based on the following criteria:
 1.	Number of Points
 2.	Number of Relative Points, which are calculated by multiplying the points obtained against each rival with the total points obtained by this rival.
 3.	Goal difference
 4.	Number of goals scored
 5.	Better performance in away matches based on the following criteria:
        1.	Number of Away Points
        2.	Number of Away Relative Points
        3.	Goal Difference in away games
        4.	Number of goals scored in away games
 6.	Number of First-Half points: considering the half-time results as the final results
 6.	Drawing of lots

League table

Round 1

|-

|-
|}

Round 2

|-

|-
|}

Round 3

|-

|-
|}

Round 4

|-

|-
|}

Round 5

|-

|-
|}

Round 6

|-

|-
|}

Repechage

Round of 16

Quarterfinals

Semifinals

Final

External links
 
 Official Website
  Dechalaca Copa Peru
  Semanario Pasión

2015
Peru
2015 in Peruvian football